Weediquette is a documentary television series following Vice Media correspondent Krishna Andavolu as he chronicles the science, culture, and economics of the legalization of marijuana.

History
Weediquette started in 2012 as a weekly column by Abdullah Saeed, then continued as a Vice.com web series in 2013. During a 2014 interview with José Mujica, Andavolu smoked a joint with President of Uruguay.

When the Viceland channel launched in February 2016, Weediquette transitioned to television, airing three seasons through 2017.

Episodes

Web series (2013–14)

Season 1 (2016)

Season 2 (2016) 
The series airs on Viceland, Wednesday nights at 10pm ET / 9pm CT.

Season 3 (2017) 
The series airs on Viceland.

See also 
 Spike Jonze, Creative Director of Vice Media

References

External links 
 Weediquette at Viceland.com

2013 American television series debuts
2017 American television series endings
2010s American documentary television series
English-language television shows
Television series about cannabis
Viceland original programming